Stenalia cechovskyi is a beetle in the genus Stenalia of the family Mordellidae. It was described by Jan Horák in 2006 and is endemic to Malaysia where it was discovered in Cameron Highlands. The species is black in colour and have dark yellow elytron.

References

cechovskyi
Beetles described in 2006
Endemic fauna of Malaysia